Bruce Kerry Chapman (born December 1, 1940) is the founder and current chairman of the board of the Discovery Institute, an American conservative think tank often associated with the religious right. He was previously a journalist, a Republican politician, and a diplomat. He is the author, most recently, of Politicians: The Worst Kind of People to Run the Government, Except for All the Others (Discovery Institute Press, 2018).

Early life and career
Born in Evanston, Illinois, Chapman graduated from Harvard University in 1962, served in the U.S. Air Force Reserves, and worked as an editorial writer for the New York Herald Tribune. With his college roommate George Gilder, Chapman wrote an attack on the anti-intellectual policies of Barry Goldwater titled The Party That Lost Its Head (1966). In 1966 he moved to Seattle and wrote a book entitled The Wrong Man in Uniform, arguing against conscription, and for an all-volunteer military (Trident Press, 1967).

Chapman became active in politics through the Seattle Young Republicans, and became a member of the United States Republican Party.  He was elected to the Seattle City Council in 1971.  In 1975, he was appointed Secretary of State of Washington, and won election twice (1975, 1976). He campaigned for the office of Governor of Washington in 1980, but ultimately did not win the Republican nomination.

Chapman was appointed by President Ronald Reagan to the position of Director of the United States Census Bureau and served in that role from 1981 until 1983.  Between 1983 and 1985 he was Deputy Assistant to President Reagan and Director of the White House Office of Planning and Evaluation.  From 1985 to 1988 he served in the appointed position of United States Ambassador to the United Nations International Organizations in Vienna.  His portfolio included nuclear proliferation, refugees, economic development, and the control of narcotics.

Intelligent design
From 1988 to 1990, Chapman was a fellow at the Hudson Institute, a conservative think tank. In 1990, he left Hudson and founded the Discovery Institute.  The institute is best known as the hub of the pseudoscientific Intelligent design movement, and also focuses on a broad range of issues, including economics, transportation, technology, and citizen leadership.

References

External links 
 Bruce Chapman biography from the Discovery Institute
 Discovery's Creation A brief history of the founding of the Discovery institute and how the Wedge Document was made public.

 

1940 births
Living people
Discovery Institute fellows and advisors
Intelligent design advocates
Writers from Evanston, Illinois
Military personnel from Illinois
Secretaries of State of Washington (state)
Seattle City Council members
United States Census Bureau people
20th-century American writers
Washington (state) Republicans
Harvard University alumni
Roosevelt family
Representatives of the United States to the United Nations International Organizations in Vienna
Reagan administration personnel
United States Air Force reservists